Beijing–Xiong'an–Shangqiu high-speed railway (京雄商高铁) is a high-speed railway under construction in China. The section from Xiong'an to Shangqiu is also called Xiong'an–Shangqiu high-speed railway (雄商高铁).

History
The  to  section had been expected to start construction in January 2021. Construction officially started on 30 September 2022.

The  to  section is part of long-term planning.

Route
The route will form part of Beijing–Hong Kong (Taipei) corridor. The section between Beijing and Xiong'an will be the second to link the two cities, taking a more direct route than the existing Beijing–Xiong'an intercity railway.

Stations

References

High-speed railway lines in China
High-speed railway lines under construction